The Parvatadvaraka dynasty was a royal house that controlled the Tel river valley (Kalahandi) in the Indian state of Orrisa. The Parvatadvarakas were devotees of the goddess Stambhesvari.

List of rulers
The known rulers of Parvatadvaraka include:
Sobhanaraja
Tustikara

See also
Asurgarh
History of Odisha

References

History of Odisha